Körner is a municipality in the Unstrut-Hainich-Kreis district of Thuringia, Germany.

History
Within the German Empire (1871-1945), Körner was part of the Duchy of Saxe-Coburg and Gotha.

Körner is the place with the highest postal code number in Germany - 99998.

References

Unstrut-Hainich-Kreis
Saxe-Coburg and Gotha